Stuber may refer to:

People
Andrew Stueber (born 1999), American football player
Emmett Stuber (1904–1989), American football coach
Georges Stuber (1925–2006), Swiss football goalkeeper
Ruth Stuber Jeanne (1910–2004), American marimbist, percussionist, violinist, and arranger
Scott Stuber, American film producer
Werner Stuber (1900–1957), Swiss Olympic horserider

Other uses 
 58499 Stüber, asteroid
 Stuber–Stone Building, in Detroit, Michigan
 Stuber (film), 2019 American action comedy film
 Stüber, historical coin in several German regions from the 15th century to the early 19th century

German-language surnames